Oiyl is a village and the administrative center of  Oiyl district of Aktobe Region in Kazakhstan.

References

Populated places in Aktobe Region